MSIA can refer to
Master of Science in Industrial Administration, a graduate degree formerly offered by GSIA (now known as Tepper School of Business)
Master of Science in Information Assurance, a graduate degree
 Mass Spectrometric Immunoassay, protein analysis
Movement of Spiritual Inner Awareness, an American new religious movement, sometimes pronounced as acronym—"messiah".
Msia (ward), an administrative ward in the Mbozi District of Tanzania